La Trayectoria is a double-disc, 42-track compilation of Luny Tunes productions in the reggaeton genre released on June 22, 2004. The album includes

La Trayectoria compiles 42 songs from different Luny Tunes productions, including hits by some of the best-known artists in reggaeton from the early to mid-2000s, such as Tego Calderón, Daddy Yankee, Don Omar, Wisin & Yandel, Zion & Lennox, Baby Ranks, and others.

In Allmusic the review described it as "an outstanding album that offers quality and quantity: a perfect and affordable starter CD for neophytes."

The album was certified double platinum by the RIAA.

Track listing
Disc 1    
Amor (Baby Ranks, Jose Angel Saavedra)    
Dime (Joan & O'Neill)    
Tus Ojos (Nicky Jam)    
Presión (Wibal & Alex)    
Perdón (O'Neill)    
Estuve Contigo (Joan)    
Lo Mío (Yo-Seph "The One")    
Búscame (Varón)
Entre Tú y Yo (Don Omar)    
Míralos (Don Omar)    
Esta Noche Hay Pelea (Wisin)    
Bandida (Zion & Lennox)    
Desafío (Tempo, Tego Calderón, Don Omar, Alexis, Wisin & Yandel)    
Aquí Está Tu Caldo (Daddy Yankee)    
Al Natural (Tego Calderón)    
Guáyale El Mahón (Yandel)    
Ya Estoy Llegando (Divino)  
Los Pistoleros (Wisin & Yandel)    
Si Te Pongo Mal (Hector & Tito)    
Los Anormales (Divino & Daddy Yankee)    
Métele Sazón (Tego Calderón)    
Disc 2    
Dale Don Dale (Don Omar)    
Motívate Baby (Baby Ranks)    
En La Disco Bailoteo (Wisin & Yandel)    
Si Tú Me Calientas (Yaga & Mackie)    
Puedo Con Todos (Don Omar)    
En Tensión (Zion & Lennox)    
Chica Ven (Plan B)    
Te Quiero Ver (Baby Rasta & Gringo)    
Pasto y Pelea (Don Omar)    
Villana (Hector & Tito)    
Vamos Pa' La Disco" (Las Guanábanas)    
Quiero (Zion & Lennox)    
Métele Con Candela (Daddy Yankee)    
Baílalo Como Tú Quieras (Tego Calderón)    
Maulla (Yaga & Mackie)    
Say Ho (Yandel)    
Cae La Noche (Hector & Tito)    
Quiero Saber (Ivy Queen & Gran Omar)    
Cazando Voy (Angel & Khriz)    
Aventura (Wisin & Yandel)    
Bailando Provocas (Trebol Clan)

Charts

Sales and certifications

See also
List of number-one Billboard Tropical Albums from the 2000s

References

2004 compilation albums
Luny Tunes albums
Albums produced by Noriega
Albums produced by Luny Tunes
Albums produced by Nely